The Jungian Society for Scholarly Studies is a North American interdisciplinary organization of scholars interested in developing, extending and applying the theories of Carl Gustav Jung to natural sciences, social sciences, humanities, and the arts.

Publications
The society publishes the Journal of Jungian Scholarly Studies, an annual peer-reviewed open access academic journal established in 2005. The journal is published by the University of Alberta Libraries and contains scholarly articles on a wide range of subjects related to Jungian theory.

Each volume reflects the theme of the annual conference of the Jungian Society for Scholarly Studies.

Conferences
The society organizes an annual meeting where original papers, roundtable discussions, and workshops are presented.

References

External links

Journal of Jungian Scholarly Studies

Organizations established in 2002
Learned societies of the United States
Analytical psychology